Heringsdorf Airport  is a regional airport located near Garz on the island of Usedom in Germany. It used to be an East German airbase and today features summer leisure routes from cities in Germany and Switzerland as well as general aviation.

The largest town on the island however is Świnoujście in Poland, immediately to the east of the airport.

Facilities
Heringsdorf Airport features a single small terminal building equipped with check-in facilities and an information desk. The apron features one stand for mid-sized-aircraft such as the Airbus A319 and several stands for smaller aircraft such as the Cessna 172. By winter 2015, the airport has been equipped with renewed firefighting and security facilities as well as a refurbished check-in area.

Airlines and destinations
The following airlines currently operate seasonal flights at Heringsdorf Airport:

The nearest major international airport is Berlin, approx.  to the south.

Statistics

Ground transportation
Usedomer Bäderbahn busline 286 runs from Heringsdorf to the airport from Monday to Friday; there is no direct public transport connection to Świnoujście. Rental cars and taxis are also available.

See also
 List of airports in Germany
 Transport in Germany

References

External links

 
 

Hering
Luftstreitkräfte airbases
Usedom